"Hinahanap-Hanap Kita" is a song recorded by Filipino rock band Rivermaya in 1997. It was released as the first single from their third album Atomic Bomb.

Reception
David Gonzales from AllMusic wrote that "Hinahanap-hanap Kita" ("Always Looking for You") and "Kung Ayaw Mo, Huwag Mo" ("If You Don't Like, Then Don't") are geared towards Filipino pop, and were hit singles for the band.

Daniel Padilla version

"Hinahanap-Hanap Kita" is the first digital single by Filipino actor Daniel Padilla, which was released online as a radio single on April 20, 2012 and later on his self-titled debut album, Daniel Padilla on May 27, 2012. It also featured in his prime-time show Princess and I and on its soundtrack Love Songs from Princess and I which was released on June 15, 2012.

Background
"Hinahanap-Hanap Kita" was the first commercial digital single released from Padilla's self-titled debut album, which was released on April 20, 2012. The song became a mainstream radio hit, and was also used as one of the theme songs of ABS-CBN's television series, Princess and I, in which he had a lead role alongside Kathryn Bernardo. It was adopted as well for a television commercial of Whisper.

Other versions
The song has been covered by Regine Velasquez (2003), Sitti (2007), Jolina Magdangal and Dennis Trillo (2009), Rey Cantong (2014) and by Harana (2017).

References

1997 singles
Rivermaya songs
2012 singles
1997 songs
Tagalog-language songs
Songs written by Rico Blanco